Orchestina gappi is an extinct spider which existed in what is now France during the late Albian age. It was described in 2012.

References

Oonopidae
Spiders of Europe
Early Cretaceous arthropods
Early Cretaceous animals of Europe
Albian life
Mesozoic arachnids
Prehistoric arthropods of Europe
Spiders described in 2012
Fossil taxa described in 2012